Nagalpur Lake is located in Nagalpur neighbourhood of Mehsana city in Gujarat state of India. There is a proposal for its development as a public space.

History
Under the project by Gujarat Uraban Development Corporation, the treated sewage water was to be drained in the lake. But the sewage water was drained untreated in the lake.

In January 2019, the Mehsana Municipality appointed a consultant to prepare a detailed project report (DPR) for the development of the lake. The municipality allotted  and  respectively for the development of lake in 2019-20 and 2020-21 budgets respectively.

Proposal
The preliminary development proposal includes a cordon wall, a garden and a children's park along with a storm water drainage system for the lake. As of January 2021, the development work is not started.

See also 
 Para Lake
 Rajmahal, Mehsana
 Boter Kothani Vav

References

Lakes of Gujarat
Mehsana